Daya Saran Sinha (Born on 18th of March 1941) is an Indian Judge and Former Chief Justice of the Gujarat High Court and the former chairperson of Gujarat Human Rights Commission.

Career
Sinha was born in 1941. He graduated in Arts and Law from the University of Allahabad in 1957 and 1959 respectively. After passing Law he started practice in the Allahabad High Court and Supreme Court of India on Civil, Company, Tax and Constitutional matters. He worked as Member of Allahabad High Court Legal Aid, Standing Counsel and Additional Chief Standing Counsel of State of Uttar Pradesh. Sinha appeared as a Senior Counsel of the Eastern Railways and many statutory bodies of Uttar Pradesh Government. He became the Judge of Allahabad High Court in 1986. He also received a degree of D.Litt ( Doctor of Literature ). On 17 March 2002 he was elevated as the Chief Justice of the Gujarat High Court. In his tenure Justice Sinha served as the Chairperson of Gujarat State Human Rights Commission. He retired on 18 March 2003 from the post of the Chief Justice.

References

1941 births
Living people
Indian judges
20th-century Indian judges
Judges of the Allahabad High Court
Chief Justices of the Gujarat High Court
University of Allahabad alumni